Anne Marie Cancelmi (born July 31, 1975), known professionally as Annie Parisse, is an American actress. She portrayed Alexandra Borgia on the drama series Law & Order. Parisse has also starred as Julia Snyder on the soap opera As the World Turns, for which she was nominated for a Daytime Emmy Award.

Early life 
Parisse was born in Anchorage, Alaska, the daughter of Annette, a teacher, and Louis G. Cancelmi, a senior executive with Alaska Airlines. Her brother Louis is also an actor. Louis is married to Elisabeth Waterston, a daughter of Law & Order veteran Sam Waterston.

Parisse grew up in Mercer Island, Washington, and attended Mercer Island High School.

Parisse moved to New York City when she was 18 to attend Fordham University, where she majored in theater and appeared in numerous productions, including Medea and Antigone, both of which featured her as the lead.

Career

Television and film 
Parisse joined the cast of the CBS soap opera As the World Turns as Julia Snyder from 1998 to 2001 and returned for a few episodes in 2002. She was later nominated for a Daytime Emmy Award for Outstanding Younger Actress in a Drama Series in 2001.

Early in her career, Parisse guest starred on shows such as Big Apple, Third Watch, and Friends. She made a 2002 appearance on Law & Order, playing an exotic dancer in the episode "Attorney Client", where she testified against a defendant (a defense attorney) who plotted the murder of his wife. This made her one of the Law & Order cast members who had a solo appearance prior to securing a sustaining role, along with Jerry Orbach, S. Epatha Merkerson, Michael Imperioli, Milena Govich, and Jeremy Sisto.  

In a 2002 supporting role, Parisse portrayed Jeannie Ashcroft in How to Lose a Guy in 10 Days. She also had a minor role in the 2004 action movie National Treasure, playing the role of Agent Dawes. For the 2005 film Monster-in-Law, she held a supporting role.

Parisse was a main cast member of Law & Order during seasons 15 and 16. Parisse quit her role on Law & Order, making her final appearance in the May 17, 2006, season finale, in which her character is murdered.

In the 2010 war drama The Pacific, Parisse took on the role of Marine Sergeant Lena Riggi Basilone, wife of John Basilone, the revered United States Marine Gunnery Sergeant. She had a recurring role on CBS' Person of Interest as Kara Stanton, the former partner of Jim Caviezel's character John Reese. In August 2012, Parisse was cast in a regular role on the Fox series The Following, premiering on January 21, 2013, as an FBI specialist. In 2016, Parisse appeared in the HBO series Vinyl as Andrea Zito, and in 2017, starred in the Netflix series Friends from College as Samantha "Sam" Delmonico. In 2018, she appeared in Paterno opposite Al Pacino.

Stage 
Starting on March 8, 2007, Parisse starred in a revival of Craig Lucas's Prelude to a Kiss, with Alan Tudyk and John Mahoney. In 2008, Parisse reprised her work in an Off Broadway performance as the title role of Becky Shaw. In the summer of 2011, Parisse appeared in the New York Public Theater's Shakespeare in the Park productions of Measure for Measure and All's Well that Ends Well.

Personal life 
Parisse is married to actor Paul Sparks. They have a son, Emmett (born 2009), and a daughter, Lydia (born 2014). They reside in Manhattan, New York City, New York.

Filmography

Film

Television

Awards and nominations 
 2001: Nominated for a Daytime Emmy Award for Outstanding Younger Actress in a Drama Series for As the World Turns

References

External links 
 
 
 

1975 births
20th-century American actresses
21st-century American actresses
Actresses from Anchorage, Alaska
Actresses from Seattle
Actresses from Washington (state)
American film actresses
American Shakespearean actresses
American soap opera actresses
American stage actresses
American television actresses
Fordham University alumni
Living people
People from Mercer Island, Washington
Mercer Island High School alumni